AECT may refer to:
Auckland Energy Consumer Trust
Association for Educational Communications and Technology